The Piano Sonata No. 17 in D minor, Op. 31, No. 2, was composed in 1801–02 by Ludwig van Beethoven. It is usually referred to as The Tempest (or Der Sturm in his native German), but the sonata was not given this title by Beethoven, or indeed referred to as such during his lifetime. The name comes from a reference to a personal conversation with Beethoven by his associate Anton Schindler in which Schindler reports that Beethoven suggested, in passing response to his question about interpreting it and Op. 57, the Appassionata sonata, that he should read Shakespeare's Tempest; some however have suggested that Beethoven may have been referring to the works of C. C. Sturm, the preacher and author best known for his Reflections on the Works of God in Nature, a copy of which he owned and, indeed, had heavily annotated. Although much of Schindler's information is distrusted by classical music scholars, this is a first-hand account unlike any other that any scholar reports. The British music scholar Donald Francis Tovey says in A Companion to Beethoven's Pianoforte Sonatas: "With all the tragic power of its first movement the D minor Sonata is, like Prospero, almost as far beyond tragedy as it is beyond mere foul weather. It will do you no harm to think of Miranda at bars 31–38 of the slow movement... but people who want to identify Ariel and Caliban and the castaways, good and villainous, may as well confine their attention to the exploits of Scarlet Pimpernel when the Eroica or the C minor Symphony is being played."

Structure 

The piece consists of three movements and takes approximately twenty-five minutes to perform:

Each of the movements is in sonata form, though the second lacks a substantial development section.

First movement 

The first movement alternates brief moments of seeming peacefulness with extensive passages of turmoil, after some time expanding into a haunting "storm" in which the peacefulness is lost. This musical form is unusual among Beethoven sonatas to that date. Concerning the time period and style, it was thought of as an odd thing to write (a pianist's skills were demonstrated in many ways, and showing changes in tone, technique and tempo efficiently many times in one movement was one of them). The development begins with rolled, long chords, quickly ending to the tremolo theme of the exposition. There is a long recitative section at the beginning of this movement's recapitulation (foreshadowing the oboe recitative in the first movement of Symphony No. 5), again ending with fast and suspenseful passages that resolve to the home key of D minor.

Second movement 

The second movement in B major is slower and more dignified. The rising melodic ideas in the opening six measures are reminiscent of the first movement's recitative. Other ideas in this movement mirror the first, for instance, a figure in the eighth measure and parallel passages of the second movement are similar to a figure in measure 6 of the first.

Third movement 

The third movement is also in sonata form and is back in the home key of D minor. It is at first flowing with emotion and then reaching a climax, before moving into an extended development section which mainly focuses on the opening figure of the movement, reaching a climax at measures 169–173. The recapitulation, which is preceded by an extensive cadenza-like passage of sixteenth notes for the right hand, is followed by another transition and then another statement of the primary theme. The refrain undergoes phrase expansion to build tension for the climax of the movement at measure 381, a fortissimo falling chromatic scale.

References

External links 
 
A lecture covering the compositional process on Beethoven's piano sonata Op. 31, No. 2
A lecture by András Schiff on Beethoven's piano sonata Op. 31, No. 2
Recording of this Sonata by Alberto Cobo
Recording of this Sonata by Serg van Gennip
Recording of this sonata by Paavali Jumppanen from the Isabella Stewart Gardner Museum
 For a public domain recording of this sonata visit Musopen

Piano Sonata 17
1802 compositions
Compositions in D minor